Hampshire 3 is an English level 12 Rugby Union league for teams based in Hampshire and the Isle of Wight. 
Hampshire 2, Hampshire 3 and Hampshire 4 are also known as Hampshire Merit Tables.
Promoted teams move up to Hampshire 2 and relegated teams drop to Hampshire 4.

Teams for 2021-22 

The teams competing in 2021-22 achieved their places in the league based on performances in 2019-20, the 'previous season' column in the table below refers to that season not 2020-21.

A combined Millbrook / Stoneham side were Hampshire 3 champions in 2019-20, they were replaced by Millbrook 2XV for the current season.  Trojans II replaced Trojans III.

Season 2020–21

On 30th October the RFU announced  that a decision had been taken to cancel Adult Competitive Leagues (National League 1 and below) for the 2020/21 season meaning Hampshire 3 was not contested.

Teams for 2019-20

See also
Hampshire RFU
English rugby union system
Rugby union in England

References

E
Rugby union in Hampshire